Andrei Sergeevich Monin (2 July 1921 – 22 September 2007) was a Russian physicist, applied mathematician, and oceanographer. Monin was known for his contributions to statistical theory of turbulence and atmospheric physics. He served as the Director of the P.P. Shirshov Institute of Oceanology of the USSR Academy of Sciences. He was instrumental in developing the Shirshov Institute into one of the largest scientific centers for ocean and earth science studies.

The Monin–Obukhov similarity theory and the Monin–Obukhov Length are named after Monin and Russian Academician Alexander Mikhailevich Obukhov.

Life and work
Monin was born on 2 July 1921 in Moscow to S. A. Monin, an Assistant Professor of the Moscow Pedagogical Institute. He joined the Mechanical and Mathematical Faculty of the Lomonosov Moscow State University in 1938 and received his bachelor's degree in 1942. Monin then enrolled for the post-graduate programme in the same university.

Military career
In 1943, Monin was called up for military service in the ranks of the Red Army where he was asked to join the military courses of weather forecasters organized at the Higher Hydrometeorological Institute of the Red Army. He joined in the rank of lieutenant and sent to the 3rd Baltic Front where he was section leader of a frontal meteorological station. He served in the army during the whole military campaign from the liberation of Pskov until the liberation of Riga. In 1945, Monin was attached to the Central Institute of Weather Forecasting of the Red Army. In 1946, he was demobilized and worked as a research fellow at the Central Institute of Weather Forecasting.

Education and early career
In 1946, Monin came back to Moscow State University to continue his post-graduate programme under the direct guidance of Academician Andrey Kolmogorov who prepared and defended his Candidate's thesis on the theory of atmospheric turbulence. In 1951 Monin started to work at the Atmospheric Physics Department at Geophysical Institute of the USSR Academy of Sciences, which later recognized as the Atmospheric Physics Institute (presently The Obhukov Institute of Atmospheric Physics). At the latter Institute he was a senior scientist, Head of a department and a scientific consultant. In 1956 he defended his Doctor's thesis on the theory of turbulent diffusion.

Awards and honors
A. S. Monin had received many honors and medals: among them are: 
Foreign member of the American Academy of Arts and Sciences, 1973.
Foreign member of the United States National Academy of Sciences, 1976.
Honorary Doctor of the University of Gothenburg, Sweden, 1986.
Academician of the Russian Academy of Natural Sciences, 1991.
State Prize in the field of science, 1980.
Yu. M. Shokalsky Prize, 1986.
Alexander Friedmann Prize by Russian Academy of Sciences in 1993.

Books authored
Monin was a prolific author of scientific works on various topics, including theory of turbulence, atmospheric physics, planetology, and meteorology. He was the author of about 620 scientific publications, including 24 monographs and the ten-volume "Okeanologia". Almost all of his books have been translated into foreign languages.

Noted for its clarity as well as its comprehensive treatment, the book "Statistical Fluid Mechanics: Mechanics of Turbulence", co-authored with A. M. Yaglom, is considered to be a classic work on theory of turbulence. Science while reviewing this book had observed: "If ever a book on turbulence could be called definitive, it is this book by two of Russia's most eminent and productive scientists in turbulence, oceanography, and atmospheric physics."

A. S. Monin, An Introduction to the Theory of Climate, D. Reidel Publishing Company, Netherlands, 1986.
A. S. Monin, Theoretical Geophysical Fluid Dynamics, Kluwer Academic Publishers, Netherlands, 1990.
A. S. Monin and A. M. Yaglom, Statistical Fluid Mechanics: Mechanics of Turbulence, Dover Publications, 2007.
A. S. Monin, Weather Forecasting as a Problem in Physics, The MIT Press, 1972.
A. S. Monin and R. V. Ozmidov, Turbulence in the Ocean, D. Reidel Publishing Company, Netherlands, 1985.

References

External links

Monin Andrei Sergeevich at the Russian Academy of Sciences

1921 births
2007 deaths
Soviet physicists
20th-century Russian physicists
Corresponding Members of the USSR Academy of Sciences
Full Members of the Russian Academy of Sciences
Foreign associates of the National Academy of Sciences
Moscow State University alumni
Academic staff of the Moscow Institute of Physics and Technology
Recipients of the USSR State Prize
Fluid dynamicists
Russian meteorologists
Burials in Troyekurovskoye Cemetery
Soviet meteorologists
Soviet military personnel of World War II